Keymont is an unincorporated community in Mineral County, West Virginia, United States, located between Keyser and Piedmont on State Route 46.

References 

Unincorporated communities in Mineral County, West Virginia
Unincorporated communities in West Virginia